Jarvis Edward Cooper, often abbreviated J.E. Cooper, is an American rapper professionally known as BB Jay from Brooklyn famously noted for his vocal similarity to late hip-hop legend The Notorious B.I.G.  He is noted for his music to reflect the Christian views and values of his faith and belief in the divinity of Jesus.

Early life 
Born Jarvis Edward Cooper in Brooklyn, New York, BB Jay was raised in New Jersey. He was first introduced to Christian rap at the age of 11. He went to a Christian youth camp in Lebanon, New Jersey where he met gospel rapper Charles E. Mitchell Sr. (aka Rap'n Rev).

Career 
In 1997, BB Jay released his first single independently, called "The Pentecostal Poppa". The single was successful on radio and received rotation on BET. A year after signing with Jive Records, he released his international debut album Universal Concussion in 2000. The album was heavily promoted with music videos, singles, and national touring. In 2001, he made a guest appearance on "I Sings" by American gospel duo Mary Mary for their debut studio album, Thankful (2000). After a five-year hiatus, BB Jay recorded a collaboration album with rappers Pettidee & Demetrus titled 3 The God Way, released in 2005. Unlimited was released on June 26, 2007. The 17-track album will have a companion DVD also titled Unlimited.

BB Jay is often cited as one of the very few musicians who is openly a Christian in the mainstream hip hop industry.

Awards and achievements 
In the year 2002, BB Jay has received a Holy Hip-Hop Award and a Stellar Award for New Artist Of The Year. In 2007, he won a Carolina Holy Hip Hop Achievement Award for National Hip Hop Apostle of the Year.

References

External links 
 BB Jay on Myspace
 

Year of birth missing (living people)
Living people
American performers of Christian hip hop music